Bagnac-sur-Célé, commonly referred to simply as Bagnac, is a commune in the Lot department in the Occitania region in Southwestern France. In 2019, it had a population of 1,467. Bagnac-sur-Célé is located on the departmental border with Cantal, 11.6 km (7.2 mi) northeast of Figeac.

Demographics

Notable people
Pierre Laborie (1936–2017), historian, born in Bagnac-sur-Célé

See also
Communes of the Lot department

References

Communes of Lot (department)